The 2018 Turkmenistan Higher League (Ýokary Liga) season is the 26th season of Turkmenistan's professional football league. The season began on 3 March 2018.

League table

Top goal-scorers

References

External links
Football Federation of Turkmenistan

Turk
Ýokary Liga seasons